Makatib al-rasul is a book consisting of letters and documents attributed to Muhammad. The book was collected by The Late Ayatollah Ahmadi Miyanji.

Editor
The Late Ayatollah Ali Ahmadi Myanji was a jurist. He was born in East Azerbaijan Province in Iran. He wrote books covering religious sciences.

Subject
Makatib al-rasul includes letters addressing kings and other rulers, as well as letters about convictions during that time.

Importance
In a variety of inconsistent formats and presentations, Muhammad's writings can be found in historical and religious books. The first author to compile and edit these documents was Myanji..

Contents
Ayatollah Ahmad Miyanji divided the book into two parts. The first part contained letters read by Muhammad to Imam Ali and scribed by the latter. The second part is of those writings inviting other rulers and kings to convert to Islam. This book is in Arabic language. It has four volumes with fourteen chapters, as follows:
 Prefacing the letters by the expression "in the name God the most beneficent the most merciful"
 Explaining the words after The Expression "in the name of God"
 Evaluating the letters in terms of eloquence
 Explaining unfamiliar words and expressions
 Discussion on question "whether Prophet Muhammad was the author"
 Introducing Muslim writers
 Letters to Rulers and kings on the Invitation to Islam
 Those of letters without photos
 Those letters written in the hand of other Imams
 Letters on public invitations
 Letters to the faithful
 Convictions and treaties
 Letters on giving properties such as lands
 Miscellaneous letters

Style and Methodology
Sources include the Hadith, History and Sirah. He references every letter after introducing it. The editor also provides accompanying critiques and analysis.

Publication
This book was published for the first time in 1339 solar. Later the book has published in 4 volumes along with corrections and additions by Dar Al Hadith publications. The first three volumes of the book include the original discussions and the fourth volume encompasses the content of verses and narrations.

References

Books about Islam